Bretz may refer to:

 Bretz (surname)
 Bretz, Preston County, West Virginia, an unincorporated community in Preston County, West Virginia
 Bretz, Tucker County, West Virginia, an unincorporated community in Tucker County, West Virginia
 Bretz Mill, California, Fresno County, California
 Old Bretz Mill, California, an unincorporated community in Fresno County